Leptocytheridae is a family of ostracods belonging to the order Podocopida.

Genera

Genera:
 Aenigmocythere Bonaduce, Masoli & Pugliese, 1976
 Amnicythere Devoto, 1965
 Bisulcocythere Ayress & Swanson, 1991

References

Ostracods